Events from the year 1544 in art.

Events
 September 10 - Italian painter Girolamo da Treviso is killed by cannon shot at the First Siege of Boulogne while working as a military engineer for Henry VIII of England.

Works

 Luca Cambiaso – Hercules
 Lucas Cranach the Younger – Hunt in Honour of Charles V at the Castle of Torgau
 Master John – Lady Mary, daughter to... King Henry the Eighth
Giorgio Vasari - Six Tuscan Poets

Births
January 24 - Gillis van Coninxloo, Dutch painter of forest landscapes (died 1607)
date unknown
Jacopo Bertoia, Italian painter of a late-Renaissance or Mannerist style (died 1574)
Giovanni Guerra, Italian draughtsman and painter (died 1618)
Ambrosius Francken I, Flemish painter (died 1616)
Jan de Hoey, Dutch painter (died 1615)
Francesco Morandini, Italian painter active in Florence (died 1597)
Joos van Winghe, Flemish painter (died 1603)

Deaths
July 17 - Giovanni Antonio Sogliani, Italian painter (born 1492)
September 10 - Girolamo da Treviso, Italian painter (born 1508)
date unknown
Chén Chún, Chinese artist specializing in "ink and wash" paintings (born 1483)
Vincenzo Civerchio, Italian painter of the Renaissance (born 1470)
Jost de Negker, Dutch woodcut-maker, printer and publisher (born 1485)
Lucas Horenbout, Flemish artist and court miniaturist to King Henry VIII of England (born 1490/1495)
Alessandro Oliverio, Italian painter (born 1500)

References

 
Years of the 16th century in art